Yannoulis Chalepas (August 14, 1851 – September 15, 1938) was a Greek sculptor and a significant figure of Modern Greek art.

Life
Chalepas was born in Pyrgos, on the island of Tinos in 1851, from a family of marble hewers. From 1869 to 1872, he studied at the School of Arts in Athens, under Neoclassical sculptor Leonidas Drossis. In 1873, he left for Munich, under a scholarship of the Panhellenic Holy Foundation of the Evangelistria of Tinos, to continue his studies at the Munich Academy of Fine Arts under the Neoclassical sculptor Max von Widnmann. His scholarship was intercepted to be given to another student. He returned to Athens in 1876, opened a workshop and began working individually.

Mental illness
In 1878, Chalepas suffered a nervous breakdown. He began destroying some of his sculptures and made several suicide attempts. His condition worsened and from July 11, 1888 to June 6, 1902, he was committed to the Mental Hospital of Corfu. In 1901 his father died and the next year his mother went to Corfu and took Chalepas to Tinos. After his return, Chalepas lived under his mother's strict supervision, who blamed sculpture for her son's illness and prevented him from sculpting, destroying everything he created.

Rehabilitation
His mother died in 1916 and Chalepas began to work again with insufficient means, after a long time of inactivity. He gained attention and made contacts with intellectual circles in Athens. Also, many eminent personalities of the arts, such as Thomas Thomopoulos, member of the Academy of Athens, and Zacharias Papantoniou, director of the National Gallery of Athens, visited him in Tinos. In 1925, an exhibition of Chalepas' works was organized by the Academy of Athens, and in 1927 he received the Academy's “Award for Excellence in Arts and Letters”. In 1930 he moved to Athens and continued working until his death on September 15, 1938.

Art

The creative production of Chalepas is shared between two periods, the first, from the early years to the start of his mental illness, and the second, called the "post-sanity" period (1918–1938) which is divided into two phases. The first corresponds to the years of rehabilitation in Tinos, from 1918 to 1930, and the second spans the last years of his life, from 1930 to his death in 1938. Chalepas's early work shows the rare maturity of the artist from the very beginning.

Gallery

References

External links 
 "Chalepas Yannoulis and photos" from National Gallery. Archived 04/10/2018. Retrieved 04/10/2018.

1851 births
1938 deaths
Greek sculptors
People from Tinos
Sculptors who committed suicide
Academy of Fine Arts, Munich alumni
Burials at the First Cemetery of Athens
20th-century Greek sculptors
19th-century sculptors
1938 suicides
19th-century Greek sculptors
Suicides in Greece